This index measures and ranks how difficult it is to vote in each state in the United States, focusing on voter registration and voting rules. The index also has rankings for every 2 years since 1996.

Component Parts of the Index 
The 2022 iteration of the index has 10 categories with various criteria within each category to measure and rank each state on how easy it is to vote.

Factors Not in Index 
The following factors, while not included, also influence the ease and likelihood of voting or voter suppression.

Ballot initiatives often give voters more reasons to go to the polls by offering a straightforward way to streamline their own election process by circumventing the incumbent politicians.

Ballot length: ballots with dozens and dozens of items to vote on can discourage citizens from doing the difficult research they may feel is required, spending less time researching each race.

Compulsory voting: voting is easier when 90%+ of citizens vote, creating positive cultural norms, establishing voting habits, and having more citizens who can help each other navigate the process.

Election frequency and timing: two-round elections, recall elections, and off-year elections all suppress voter turnout.

Gerrymandering can disincentivize voting by artificially making certain races less competitive.

Information accessibility and press freedom: information warfare, support for public or nonprofit media, and transparency in government operations all influence the ease of voting and trust of voting systems through enhanced election security. 2/3 of U.S. college students cited a lack of information as a reason for why they didn't vote.

Party membership requirements: requiring voters to register with a party makes voting more complex and difficult, especially for those people who don't identify with the party that is likely to win the seat in the general election.

Purges of voter rolls: the act of unregistering voters by sending postcards requiring what amounts to re-registration or employing a 'use it or lose it' approach where after a certain number of elections of not voting, voters are automatically removed from the voter rolls without any evidence that they have moved.

Threats and voter intimidation: Intimidation can result from the presence of cameras or guns at polling places to ballots that may not be secret. Following-through on threats by physically harming or killing people can severely deter voter participation.

Voter enfranchisement: voting starting at the age of 16 helps the learning process of how to vote, and simplicity with regard to felony enfranchisement also makes voting simpler.

Voter verification: a substantial match standard for signatures on mail-in ballots, for example, makes it less likely for valid votes to be destroyed than in a system with an 'exact match' standard, without any evidence of an increase in fraud. Many states in the U.S., for example, also allow voters to remedy ballots where the signatures seem too different. Other sources of complications arise from issues in matching data from different databases where discrepancies could arise for lots of reasons for those with the right to vote.

Rankings (as of June 2022) 
The states at the top represent the easiest states for voting, with the states at the bottom having the most difficult process to cast a ballot.

See also 
Voter suppression

Voter suppression in the United States

References 

Voting in the United States
Voter suppression
Suffrage